Perambulator may refer to:

 Pram (baby), a type of baby transport
 Surveyor's wheel, a device for measuring distance

See also
 Perambulation (disambiguation)